Barbora "Bára" Basiková (born 17 February 1963) is a Czech singer and actress. She was named Female Singer of the Year at the 1991 Anděl Awards. In 2002, she performed the title role in the famous Czech musical, Kleopatra, at Prague's Broadway Theatre. Basiková placed third in the 1987 Zlatý slavík for female singer behind Petra Janů and Iveta Bartošová.

Discography

Studio albums
1991: Bára Basiková
1992: Responsio Mortifera
1993: Dreams Of Sphinx
1993: Viktorie královská
1998: Gregoriana
1999: Nová Gregoriana
2001: Tak jinak

Awards and nominations

References

External links

1963 births
Living people
Czechoslovak women singers
Musicians from Prague
Actresses from Prague
20th-century Czech women singers
21st-century Czech women singers